Rubén Martínez Villena (December 20, 1899 – January 16, 1934) was a Cuban writer and revolutionary leader.

He was born in Alquízar, in the La Habana province.

Biography
After graduating from the University of Havana Law School, Villena worked as a lawyer, and published poetry and short stories in newspapers and magazines from 1917 until the late 1920s.

In 1923, Villena was one of thirteen writers and artists participating in the "Protesta de los Trece" (Protest of the Thirteen), denouncing the government of President Alfredo Zayas. This led to the foundation of the Grupo Minorista, a group of artists and intellectuals who became influential in Cuban culture and politics.

After meeting Julio Antonio Mella, founder of the Communist Party of Cuba, he got more involved in the social struggle, against what was seen at the time as neocolonial governments subdued to the United States interests. In 1925 he was Mella's attorney in the trial for "insulting" President Zayas.

After contracting tuberculosis, Villena travelled to the United States and the Soviet Union, including to the Caucasus Mountains. When he returned to Cuba in 1932 he was seriously ill. During 1932 and 1933 he organized the general strike that ended Gerardo Machado's government.

He died in Havana on June 16, 1934, in La Esperanza Sanatory.

A stamp was issued December 20, 1999 by the Postal Authority in Cuba commemorating him as a revolutionary. (Scott 2010 Stamp Catalogue p. 661)

References

1899 births
1934 deaths
Cuban revolutionaries